Paul Estermann (born 24 June 1963 in Lucerne, Canton of Lucerne) is a Swiss equestrian who competes in the sport of show jumping.

In June 2012, Paul Estermann was ranked 156 in the world.

Career 
Paul Estermann learnt to ride growing up on his family's farm in Traselinge, Switzerland. He began riding on a pony, then a jumper. During his apprenticeship as a farmer he devoted his leisure time to show jumping.

In 2012, he competed with Castelfield Eclipse at his first Olympics in the team jumping and individual jumping events.

Personal life 
Paul has one daughter and manages the equestrian centre (Reitsportcenter) Estermann in Hildisrieden, above Lake Sempach, where he is currently living.

Horses 
current horses:
 Castlefield Eclipse (Milly) (* 2002), Irish Sport Horse, Mare, Father's father: obos quality. Entrusted to Mr. Estermann by Jocelyn and Arturo Fasana.
 Quinara 13 (* 2003), Mare, Father: Quinto, Father's father: Quattro B, Mother: Poesie, Mother's father: Phantom.
 Maloubet du Temple (* 2000), Stallion, Father: Balubet du Rouet, Mother: Elverdie du Temple, Mother's father: Ouragan de Baussy.
 Lancero (* 2003), Gelding, Father: Lancer II, Father's father: Landgraf I, Mother: Olentia, Mother's father: Lentigo.
 Lafayette III (*2004), Mare, Father: Acorus, Father's father: Accord II, Mother: La Vie, Mother's father: Calido.

former show horses:
 Calinka II
 Kali de la Croix 
 Zador 
 Kaiser de Quesnoy 
 Uddel
 Kobold V

Successes 
 Nations Cups:
July 2012: with Castlefield Eclipse - Rank 4 (Team) + Rank 4 (Individual)
June 2012: with Castlefield Eclipse - Rank 5 (Team) + Rank 5 (Individual)
May 2012: with Castlefield Eclipse - Rank 2 (Team) + Rank 2 (Individual)

References

External links
Reitsportcenter Estermann Official site

1963 births
Living people
Equestrians at the 2012 Summer Olympics
Olympic equestrians of Switzerland
Swiss show jumping riders
Swiss male equestrians
Sportspeople from Lucerne
20th-century Swiss people